"Hammer the Hammer" was released as a stand-alone single by Australian indie group The Go-Betweens. It was released as a 7" vinyl record on the Missing Link Records label in Australia in June 1982 and by Rough Trade Records in the United Kingdom in July,  with "By Chance" as the B-side. Forster considered that "By Chance" was a personal break-through for him. Pitchfork Media describes "By Chance" as sounding "more than a bit like the early Smiths.

Details
According to music journalist Clinton Walker "Hammer the Hammer" was about McLennan's growing taste for narcotics encouraged by a proximity to the Birthday Party. McLennan however denied that the song was about drugs and in the liner notes for the band's compilation album, 1978-1990, he describes it as being "an incomplete meditation on loneliness and violence, sometimes mistakenly thought to be about drugs".

Forster described the song as, "Grant's first great pop tune. An urgent, melodic verse, a foot to the floor chorus - its lyric just the repeated title. Perfect. From his earliest songs I found his lyrics surprisingly oblique and melancholic."

The band recorded the two songs at Armstrong's Audio Visual (A.A.V.) Studios in Melbourne, at the same time as The Birthday Party was recording Junkyard. It was during these sessions that the two groups decided to collaborate on a song. The result, "After the Fireworks", was a Forster/McLennan joint composition with the lyrics by Nick Cave. It was subsequently released by on Au Go Go Records (ANDA-22) under the name Tuff Monks.

Reception
Reviewed in NME at the time of release, it was described as, "Miscreant pop music attempting to disgrace its fealty to any number of sources. It seems to stumble when a stride is called for and winds up notating needless obscurities. Vacancy trussed up as abstraction is not the stuff of success, in any sense."

The Guardian describes the song as an "odd, punkish sort of folk rock, deceptively primitive and sometimes rattlingly suggestive of the Velvet Underground."

Track listing

Original 7" Vinyl release

Release history

Credits
The Go-Betweens
 Robert Forster – vocals, rhythm guitar
 Grant McLennan – vocals, bass guitar, lead guitar
 Lindy Morrison – drums, vocals

Production
 Producer, Engineer — Tony Cohen
 Producer — The Go-Betweens

References

External links
 "Hammer The Hammer" @ MusicBrainz
 "Hammer The Hammer" @ Discogs

1982 singles
The Go-Betweens songs
1982 songs
Rough Trade Records singles
Songs written by Grant McLennan